INNO, formerly branded Galeria Inno, is a Belgian department store chain that operates 16 stores. It is a subsidiary of German Galeria Karstadt Kaufhof.

History

It was founded in 1897 in Brussels as A l'Innovation. INNO was a founder and has remained member of the International Association of Department Stores from 1928 to 2001. Emile Bernheim has been 4 times the president of the Association in 1931, 1935, 1950, 1960.

Since 2001, the chain has been owned by the Galeria Kaufhof group, which was subsequently acquired by Hudson's Bay Company in 2015. 

As of February 2023, INNO's current owner, Galeria Karstadt Kaufhof, supposedly plans to spin-off and sell the Belgian INNO branch as part of its own insolvency procedings.

Locations
INNO operates overall 16 department stores throughout Belgium, of which three are located in Brussels.

References

External links
  

Retail companies of Belgium
Companies based in Brussels

de:A l'innovation